Charles Joseph Myrtle III (February 6, 1945 – April 11, 2022) was a professional American football player who played linebacker for seven seasons for the Denver Broncos and the San Diego Chargers. His final season of pro football came in 1975 as a member of the Jacksonville Express of the World Football League.

References

1945 births
2022 deaths
People from Hyattsville, Maryland
Players of American football from Buffalo, New York
Players of American football from Maryland
American football linebackers
Maryland Terrapins football players
Denver Broncos (AFL) players
Denver Broncos players
San Diego Chargers players
Archbishop Carroll High School (Washington, D.C.) alumni